Sex Competition is a 2013 Russian comedy film directed by Sarik Andreasyan. The film became the leader of the Russian box-office on the basis of the weekend of February 28 —  March 3.

Plot
An extravagant millionaire invites four young men to participate in a sex tournament - a game with a prize of half a million dollars. The goal is to seduce as many women as possible in 5 days of stay at the seaside resort. But the targets are not easy – grandmother, wife of an oligarch, virgin, feminist and sectarian. But unexpectedly love starts to interfere with the game of sex.

Cast 
 Tair Mamedov as Deni
 Roman Yunusov	as Gosha
 Konstantin Kryukov as Yarosla
 Gavriil Gordeev as Arkady
 Ravshana Kurkova as Alisa
 Anna Khilkevich as Tatyana
 Kristina Asmus as Sveta
 Natalia Medvedeva as Rita
 Ekaterina Skulkina as prostitute

References

External links 

2010s sex comedy films
Russian sex comedy films
2013 comedy films
2013 films
2010s Russian-language films